Thrombospondin-4 is a protein that in humans is encoded by the THBS4 gene.

The protein encoded by this gene belongs to the thrombospondin protein family. Thrombospondin family members are adhesive glycoproteins that mediate cell-to-cell and cell-to-matrix interactions. This protein forms a pentamer and can bind to heparin and calcium. This protein may be involved in local signaling in the developing and adult nervous system, in bone formation and fracture healing, and in osteoarthritis.

References

Further reading

Thrombospondins